This is a list of Belgian football transfers for the 2020 summer transfer window. Only transfers involving a team from the professional divisions are listed, including the 18 teams in the Belgian First Division A and the 8 teams playing in the Belgian First Division B.

The summer transfer window would have opened on 1 July 2020 and towards the end of August 2020, however due to postponed matches as a result of the coronavirus pandemic, the summer 2020 transfer windsow will open on 7 July 2020 and end on 31 August 2020, followed by an extra fall 2020 transfer window following on 7 September 2020 and closing on 5 October 2020.

Note that several transfers were announced prior to the opening date. Furthermore, players without a club may join one at any time, either during or in between transfer windows. After the transfer window closes a few completed transfers might still be announced a few days later.

Transfers

End of 2019–20 season

Footnotes

References

Belgian 1
Transfers Summer
2020 Summer